Wálter Guimarães (17 May 1913 – 21 February 1979) was a Brazilian footballer. He played for Brazil national team at the 1934 FIFA World Cup finals.

References

1913 births
1979 deaths
Brazilian footballers
Brazil international footballers
1934 FIFA World Cup players
Botafogo de Futebol e Regatas players
Association football defenders
Footballers from Rio de Janeiro (city)